The Star of Valencia is a 1933 German drama film directed by Alfred Zeisler and starring Liane Haid, Peter Erkelenz and Ossi Oswalda. It was made in Mallorca, at the same time as a French-language version The Star of Valencia directed by Serge de Poligny.

It was made at the Babelsberg Studios in Berlin. The film's sets were designed by the art director Otto Hunte. Location shooting took place in Mallorca and Valencia.

Cast

References

Bibliography

External links

1933 films
Films of the Weimar Republic
1933 drama films
1930s German-language films
Films directed by Alfred Zeisler
German multilingual films
UFA GmbH films
Films shot in Spain
Films set in Spain
German black-and-white films
Films shot at Babelsberg Studios
1933 multilingual films
1930s German films